Gulaphallus is a genus of fishes in the family Phallostethidae, native to the Philippines. They are mainly found in freshwater habitats, but G. panayensis is from brackish and marine habitats. It is the only genus in the subfamily Gulaphallinae.

Species
The currently recognized species in this genus are:
 Gulaphallus bikolanus (Herre, 1926)
 Gulaphallus eximius Herre, 1925
 Gulaphallus falcifer Manacop, 1936
 Gulaphallus mirabilis Herre, 1925
 Gulaphallus panayensis (Herre, 1942)

References

Phallostethidae